Ann Kiyomura-Hayashi (born August 22, 1955) is a retired American professional tennis player. She is from San Mateo, California.

Kiyomura played on the WTA Tour from 1973 to 1984. She played in 11 US Opens, reaching the fourth round in 1978. In 1973, she won the Wimbledon junior singles title, beating Martina Navratilova. In 1975, she won the Wimbledon women's doubles title, playing with Kazuko Sawamatsu. She reached the final of the Australian Open women's doubles in 1980.

Kiyomura played in 1981 for the short-lived Oakland Breakers of World Team Tennis (WTT). Other WTT teams of hers included the San Francisco Golden Gaters (1975), Los Angeles Strings (1978 WTT Champions), Hawaii Leis (1974) and Indiana Loves (1976–1977). In 1976, she teamed with Ray Ruffels of the Loves to lead WTT in game-winning percentage in mixed doubles.

Her parents were both involved in tennis, with her mother once a highly ranked player in Japan and her father a tennis instructor.

Grand Slam finals

Doubles (1 title, 1 runner-up)

References

External links
 
 

American female tennis players
Tennis people from California
Wimbledon champions
1955 births
Living people
Place of birth missing (living people)
Japanese-American tennis players
Wimbledon junior champions
Grand Slam (tennis) champions in women's doubles
American sportspeople of Japanese descent
People from San Mateo, California
Grand Slam (tennis) champions in girls' singles
Grand Slam (tennis) champions in girls' doubles
21st-century American women